Johann Georg Justus Perthes (11 September 1749, Rudolstadt, Schwarzburg-Rudolstadt – 2 May 1816, Gotha, Saxe-Gotha-Altenburg) was a German publisher and founder of the publishing house that bears his name.

Life
He was born in the Thuringian town of Rudolstadt, the son of a Schwarzburg court physician. From 1778 he worked as a bookseller in nearby Gotha, where he founded the cartographic publishing firm Justus Perthes Geographische Anstalt Gotha in 1785. In this, he was joined in 1814 by his son Wilhelm Perthes (1793–1853), who had been in the publishing house of Justus's nephew Friedrich Christoph Perthes at Hamburg. On Justus' death in Gotha, Wilhelm took over the firm and laid the foundation of the geographical branch of the business for which it is chiefly famous, by the first publishing of the Hand-Atlas from  1817–1823 after Adolf Stieler (1775–1836).

Wilhelm Perthes engaged the collaboration of the most eminent German geographers of the time, including Stieler, Heinrich Berghaus (1797–1884), Christian Gottlieb Reichard (1758–1837), who was associated with Stieler in the compilation of the atlas, Karl Spruner (1803–1892), and Emil von Sydow (1812–1873).

The business passed to his son Bernhardt Wilhelm Perthes (1821–1857), who was associated with August Heinrich Petermann under whose direction the well-known periodical Petermanns Geographische Mitteilungen was first edited in 1855, and Bruno Hassenstein (1839–1902); and in next generation to his son Bernhard Perthes (1858–1919), who was born after his father Bernhardt Wilhelm had died.

Since 1785 the firm also issued the Almanach de Gotha, a statistical, historical and genealogical annual (in German and French) of the various countries of the world (first published by Carl Wilhelm Ettinger, Gotha, in 1763); and in 1866 the elaborate Geographisches Jahrbuch was produced under the editorship of Ernst Behm (1830–1884), on whose death it was continued under that of Professor Hermann Wagner.

References

External links

See an 1872 map by August Petermann, published by Justus Perthes, [Map of Texas, Indian Territory, Louisiana, Arkansas, Missouri, Kansas] / bearbeitet v. H. Habenicht. hosted by the Portal to Texas History.
The 1875 Stieler Hand-Atlas, and many other maps and atlases, are viewable online at DavidRumsey.com
More information about the history and the current situation of the huge archive (map archive, bibliothèque) of 'Justus Perthes Geographische Anstalt Gotha' (including 'VEB Hermann Haack Geographisch-Kartographische Anstalt Gotha', publishing firm in the German Democratic Republic (GDR) from 1955 to 1991, and 'Justus Perthes Geographische Verlagsanstalt Darmstadt', publishing firm in Darmstadt from 1953 to 1994), as well as about the current publishing house 'Ernst Klett Verlag GmbH, Zweigniederlassung Gotha, Programmbereich Klett-Perthes' available online at perthes.de (German language)
More information about 'Almanach de Gotha' (English) online at perthes.de

1749 births
1816 deaths
German publishers (people)
Map publishing companies
People from Rudolstadt
People from Schwarzburg-Rudolstadt